The Gran Campo Nevado is a small ice field located in the southern portion of the Muñoz Gamero Peninsula, in Chile.

See also
Monte Burney
Riesco Island
Strait of Magellan

References

Bodies of ice of Magallanes Region
Ice fields of South America